Qerkhlu or Qerekhlu or Qerrekhlu may refer to:
 Qerrekhlu, Fars
 Qerekhlu, Isfahan
 Qerkhlu, Takab, West Azerbaijan Province
 Qerekhlu, Urmia, West Azerbaijan Province